Ibrahim Koma (born 5 November 1987) is a French actor. He began his career as a child actor in the film We Need a Holiday (2002) and the soap opera Sous le soleil (2002–2008). He has since starred in the films Asphalt Playground (2012), Wùlu (2016), and As Far as I Can Walk (2021). He played Passepartout in the 2021 English-language adaptation of Around the World in 80 Days.

Early life
Koma was born in the 20th arrondissement of Paris in the city's east to Soninke parents from Mali and grew up in the Baconnets quarter of Antony, Hauts-de-Seine, south of Paris. He and his siblings were brought up by their widowed mother. His older brother Diouc Koma is also an actor. Koma trained at the Cours Viriot, Actor's Studio, and Laboratoire de l'Acteur. He spent some time in London where he learned English and took classes at Birkbeck, University of London.

Filmography

Film

Television

Awards and nominations

References

External links
 

Living people
1987 births
French male child actors
French people of Malian descent
Male actors from Paris
People from Antony, Hauts-de-Seine
Soninke people
21st-century French male actors